Sally Starr may refer to:

 Sally Starr (actress) (1909–1996), theatrical and movie actress
 Sally Starr (TV hostess) (1923–2013), children's television host